Mordellochroa pulchella is a beetle in the genus Mordellochroa of the family Mordellidae. It was described in 1859 by Étienne Mulsant & Rey.

References

Mordellidae
Beetles described in 1859